Charles Andrew Stanley (born May 16, 1958), known as Andy Stanley, is an American who is the founder and senior pastor of North Point Ministries, a nondenominational evangelical Christian church with several campuses across the north metro Atlanta area.

Early life and education 
Stanley was born in Atlanta in 1958. He earned a Bachelor of Arts degree in journalism from Georgia State University and a Master of Theology from Dallas Theological Seminary.

Career 
Stanley founded North Point Community Church in Alpharetta, Georgia, a suburb of Atlanta, in 1995. 

Stanley is the author of more than 20 books, including Better Decisions, Fewer Regrets;  The New Rules for Love, Sex & Dating; Ask It; How to Be Rich; Deep & Wide; Enemies of the Heart; When Work & Family Collide; Visioneering; Next Generation Leader; and Irresistible. His television program Your Move with Andy Stanley has been broadcast since 2012.

Recognition
In 2017, a survey of U.S. pastors in Outreach magazine identified Stanley as one of the ten most influential living pastors in America. In 2016, his podcast won the Academy of Podcasters award for best spirituality and religion podcast.

Personal life 

Stanley now lives outside of Atlanta with his wife, Sandra, and their three adult children. His father is Charles Stanley, the former senior pastor of the First Baptist Church of Atlanta and founder of In Touch Ministries.

Authored books 
Not in It to Win It: Why Choosing Sides Sidelines The Church. Zondervan, 2022 
Better Decisions, Fewer Regrets. Zondervan, 2020 
Irresistible. Zondervan, 2018. .
The New Rules For Love, Sex & Dating. Zondervan, 2014. .
How To Be Rich. Zondervan, 2013. .
Deep & Wide. Zondervan, 2012. .
When Work & Family Collide. Multnomah, 2012. .
Enemies of the Heart. Multnomah, 2011. .
The Grace of God. Thomas Nelson, 2010. .
The Principle of the Path. Thomas Nelson, 2009. .
Communicating For a Change. Multnomah, 2006. .
Next Generation Leader. Multnomah, 2006. .
It Came From Within!. Multnomah, 2006. .
Fields of Gold. Tyndale, 2006. .
The Best Question Ever. Multnomah, 2004. .
Seven Practices of Effective Ministry. Multnomah, 2004. .
Creating Community. Multnomah, 2004. .
Louder Than Words. Multnomah, 2004. .
Can We Do That? Innovative Practices that will Change the Way You Do Church (With Ed Young Jr.). Howard Books, 2004. .
 How Good Is Good Enough?. Multnomah, 2003. .
Choosing To Cheat. Multnomah, 2002. .
The Seven Checkpoints: Student Journal. Howard Books 2001. .
Visioneering. Multnomah, 1998. .
Like a Rock. Thomas Nelson, 1997. .

References

External links 
 
 North Point Ministries

1958 births
20th-century Baptist ministers from the United States
21st-century American male writers
21st-century American non-fiction writers
21st-century Baptist ministers from the United States
American Christian writers
American evangelicals
American male non-fiction writers
Baptists from Georgia (U.S. state)
Baptist writers
Dallas Theological Seminary alumni
Georgia State University alumni
Living people
People from Alpharetta, Georgia